The 1989 NBL Finals was the championship series of the 1989 season of Australia's National Basketball League (NBL) and the conclusion of the season's playoffs. The North Melbourne Giants defeated the Canberra Cannons in two games (2-0) for their first NBL championship.

Format
The 1989 National Basketball League Finals started on 20 September and concluded on 20 October. The playoffs consisted of two best of three Elimination finals, two best of three Semi-finals and the best of three game Grand Final series. As the two top teams at the end of the regular season, the North Melbourne Giants and Canberra Cannons both qualified for home court advantage during the Semi-finals.

Qualification

Qualified teams

Ladder

Elimination finals

(3) Perth Wildcats vs (6) Adelaide 36ers

Game 1

Game 2

Game 3

(4) Melbourne Tigers vs (5) Sydney Kings

Game 1

Game 2

Game 3

Semi-finals

(1) Canberra Cannons vs (5) Sydney Kings

Game 1

Game 2

Game 3

(2) North Melbourne Giants vs (3) Perth Wildcats

Game 1

Game 2

Game 3

North Melbourne's 55 point win over Perth in game 3 of their Semi-final series would have been the record winning margin for an NBL Semi-final breaking the previous record of 48 held by Adelaide for their 151–103 win over Newcastle in 1985, except that on the same day Canberra beat Sydney by 60 points in the other semi final series. The Giants’ score of 165 also remains (as of the 2016 NBL Finals) the highest score in an NBL Finals game.

Grand Final series

(1) Canberra Cannons vs (2) North Melbourne Giants

Game 1

Game 2

See also
 1989 NBL season

References

Finals
National Basketball League (Australia) Finals